Thomas Zangerl (born 10 June 1983 in Kufstein) is an Austrian freestyle skier who specializes in the ski cross discipline.

He made his World Cup debut in March 2003 in Les Contamines, but was disqualified. His first valid World Cup result was a thirteenth place in Saas-Fee in November the same year. He proceeded to perform consistently in the range of 20th–30th, except for an eight place in Naeba in February. Then, until 2007 he only raced once in the World Cup, with a ninth place in Kreischberg in January 2006. The 2006–07 and 2007–08 seasons were mediocre, but in January 2009 he finished fourth in two races.

He represents the sports club WSV Walchsee.

References

External links
 
 
 
 

1983 births
Living people
Austrian male freestyle skiers
Freestyle skiers at the 2010 Winter Olympics
Freestyle skiers at the 2014 Winter Olympics
Freestyle skiers at the 2018 Winter Olympics
Olympic freestyle skiers of Austria
People from Kufstein
Sportspeople from Tyrol (state)